The Man in the Maze is a 2010 American horror film. The film was produced in the United States and premiered at the 2010 Mississippi International film Festival. was the presenter for the film.

Plot

The movie follows four college students that venture out into the woods to do research and discover an Indian burial mound. They soon discover that the mound is cursed and that they are trapped in a maze, chased by an unknown and terrifying force.

Cast

Production
Filming for the movie began in early 2010, with much of the shooting taking place in and around Florence, Alabama. The film was screened at several film festivals beginning in 2010, with the film's official release taking place in India in late 2011. Director Mitesh Patel explained the reason behind the India premiere because he "believes that cinema lovers in this country generally watch horror movies from Hollywood with great curiosity and anticipation".

Reception

Awards and recognition
Silver Ace Award at Las Vegas Film Festival 2011 
Official selection, St. Louis International Film Festival 2011
Winner, Honorable Mention Award - Los Angeles Reel Film Festival 2011

References

External links

 
 

2010 films
2010 horror films
American supernatural horror films
2010s English-language films
2010s American films